Adam Robertson may refer to:
 Adam Robertson, musician with the Australian rock band Magic Dirt
 Adam Robertson (Canadian politician) (died 1882), foundry owner and politician in Ontario, Canada
 Adam Robertson (Utah politician)